This article presents a list of United States states and territories sorted by their life expectancy at birth, sex, race, and in the past. The data in the 2018 column is taken from work funded by the Robert Wood Johnson Foundation for the 50 states and the District of Columbia; from the World Bank for Guam, Puerto Rico and the U.S. Virgin Islands; and from the CIA World Factbook for American Samoa and the Northern Mariana Islands. Data in the 2010 columns comes from Health Data. 

Overall, life expectancy at birth in Hawaii, California, and New York (state) are among the longest in the nation, while life expectancy at birth in Mississippi, American Samoa, and West Virginia are among the shortest in the nation.

The life expectancy in some states has fallen in recent years; for example, Maine's life expectancy in 2010 was 79.1 years, and in 2018 it was 78.7 years. The Washington Post noted in November 2018 that overall life expectancy in the United States was declining although in 2018 life expectancy had a slight increase of 0.1 and bringing it to having not changed since 2010.

Life expectancy in 2019

Past life expectancy, 1960–2018

Life expectancy in counties with 500,000+ people in 2019

See also

References

Life expectancy
Life expectancy
Life expectancy
United States, life expectancy
United States